MV  Brigitte Bardot (formerly MV Gojira, Rat Race Media Adventurer, Ocean 7 Adventurer and Cable and Wireless Adventurer) is a unique high-tech  stabilized monohull twin diesel engine powered vessel designed by Nigel Irens. Construction of the vessel began in June 1997 and she was launched on 16 March 1998.  The official naming ceremony took place on 3 April 1998 in London's West India Dock. In 2021, the vessel was sold to a private owner.

Cable and Wireless Adventurer
Originally named Cable and Wireless Adventurer, she was built for the purpose of circumnavigating the world in less than 80 days. This achievement set a new Guinness World Record for a powered vessel. However, on 27 June 2008 Earthrace (later renamed Ady Gil), the biodiesel powered wave-piercing trimaran, set a new world record when it docked at the Vulkan shipyard in Sagunto, Spain after completing a circumnavigation in just 60 days 23 hours and 49 minutes. Both records are longer than the 60 days, 21 hours claimed by the US Navy's  nuclear-powered submarine during Operation Sandblast in 1960 and of the current record by a sailing boat.

The design of the vessel was evaluated and proven by hydrodynamic tank testing, and a  scale prototype named the iLAN Voyager completed sea trials to demonstrate the advantages of the concept.

The vessel is equipped with state-of-the-art navigation and communications equipment.

Ocean 7 Adventurer

In 2007 the vessel was acquired by Ocean 7, a Cape Town based marine brokerage and charter operation.  The vessel was recommissioned and transferred to a mooring at the V&A Waterfront, Cape Town.  The vessel was available for charter, film work and the occasional marine rescue operation.

In December 2007 Ocean 7 Adventurer was chartered to retrieve a demasted yacht, IMOCA 60 Delta Dore from the Southern Ocean. Delta Dore was partaking in the Barcelona World Race. An hour after the mast had collapsed backwards, it had to be cut free and dumped into the ocean, as it was likely to damage the hull. The yacht had  of diesel fuel on board, but this was insufficient to motor back to the mainland. The Ocean 7 team were approached with regard to salvaging the yacht. Skippered by co-owner David de Villiers, Ocean 7 Adventurer set sail for the Southern Ocean and after locating the yacht, she was taken in tow with a  line. This rescue set a record for the longest tow in South African maritime history.

During early June 2008 Ocean 7 Adventurer moved to the east coast of South Africa to observe the annual sardine run, after which it relocated to the southern end of Madagascar in July in search of waves amongst the reefs where the vessel was used as a live-aboard base for surfers and kite surfers.  During September Ocean 7 Adventurer explored the Baron Islands off the Madagascar coast before returning to her base at the V&A Waterfront for the summer season, where she was available for day charters, specialised trips and functions.

Rat Race Media Adventurer

In 2008 she was repainted in Rat Race Media graphics and was the star of a TV series on kykNET, Aqua X. The series started in October 2008 and aired until January 2009.

Miles for Smiles Adventurer
Before setting out to sea Ocean 7 Adventurer received a new look with the Miles for Smiles regalia.

MV Gojira
The Sea Shepherd Conservation Society (SSCS) acquired the $4 million vessel for its 2010–11 campaign against Japanese whaling in the Antarctic Southern Ocean Whale Sanctuary and renamed her the MV Gojira (named after the French heavy metal band who have supported the charity, which is derived from the Japanese name for "Godzilla"). Gojira successfully located the whaling factory vessel Nisshin Maru in the Ross Sea during Sea Shepherd's Operation No Compromise, and broke a record for travelling farther south than any other multi-hulled yacht in history, at 76*30 South Latitude.

MV Brigitte Bardot

In May 2011 the SSCS was served with a notice from Toho Company Ltd., the copyright holder and owner of the Gojira/Godzilla franchise, regarding the unauthorized use of the trademark. The Society promptly changed the vessel's name to the MV Brigitte Bardot in honor of the French fashion model, actress and singer whom Paul Watson, the founder of Sea Shepherd, took on an anti-sealing trip in 1977. In addition to a new name, the vessel also received a new paint scheme; the overall black scheme was replaced by a grey coloration similar to that of a naval vessel.

The ship was damaged by a rogue wave of  while pursuing the Japanese whaling fleet off the western coast of Australia on 28 December 2011. The MV Brigitte Bardot was escorted back to Fremantle by the SSCS flagship, . The main hull was cracked and the port side pontoon was being held together by straps. The vessel arrived at Fremantle Harbor on 5 January 2012.

The repair process, with a cost of over $250,000, included placing the ship in a hermetically sealed chamber. Composite yacht experts from across the globe, including the ship's designer, were flown in to assess the damages and recommend a course of action. Sea Shepherd's 18 Australian chapters raised the money necessary to repair the vessel. Repairs to the MV Brigitte Bardot were completed and the ship set sail for sea trials on 16 April 2012.

In September 2012, the MV Brigitte Bardot was expelled from Fiji by local naval and immigration officials.

On 5 January 2013 in Timaru, New Zealand, a distress call was issued in relation to the MV Brigitte Bardot after an observer mistook the vessel for an overturned yacht. While several vessels nearby responded to the call, the MV Brigitte Bardot did not respond and instead turned away at high speed upon the arrival of a rescue helicopter. The South Canterbury Coastguard and Maritime New Zealand criticized Sea Shepherd over the incident, stating "There was no need for Sea Shepherd to behave like this". Sea Shepherd Conservation Society founder Paul Watson said the first the organization knew about the distress call was when the helicopter arrived. "We can't help it if someone else makes the call. There was nothing wrong with the ship," he said.

Because of the COVID-19 pandemic Sea Shepherd ended up selling vessels instead of maintaining them; the vessel was sold to a new owner in Mexico.

References

External links

 Ocean Adventurer website
 Ocean 7 – The team
 Cable & Wireless Adventurer website
 Miles for Smiles Madagascar Challenge
 Rat Race Media Adventurer website

Individual yachts
Sea Shepherd Conservation Society ships
Trimarans
1998 ships
Ships built in England
Brigitte Bardot